Spirydion Jan Albański (4 October 1907 – 30 March 1992), nicknamed "Spirytus" and "Romek", was a Polish football goalkeeper in the 1930s. He played for Pogoń Lwów and the Poland National Team.

Albański was born in Lwów (Lviv). He graduated from high school after the Second World War, when he was forced to move from Lwów to Upper Silesia, worked in the coal-mining industry. He was later a civil servant, and also a soccer coach.

Soccer career
He was part of the Pogoń Lwów sports club from 1928 to 1939. After the Soviets captured Lwów in late September 1939 (see: Polish September Campaign#Phase 2: Soviet aggression), he represented the newly created teams of Dinamo Lwów and Spartak Lwów. In 1944, as borders of Poland moved westwards (see: Oder-Neisse line), Albański, together with thousands of Lwów's inhabitants, was forced to leave the city. Firstly, he stayed in Rzeszów, where he played for Resovia Rzeszów. Then, from 1945 to 1946, he played a few games for Pogoń Katowice.

His most prominent seasons were those spent in Pogoń. From 1928 to 1939, Albański played in 234 games of the Polish Soccer League, which is an absolute record among Polish soccer players. He also represented Poland in 18 games (another record for all interwar goalies), including matches of the 1936 Summer Olympics in Berlin.

In the 1930s, Albański was among the most popular athletes in Poland. He was very skilled as a goalkeeper, although he was considered too skinny at first (at the beginning of his career he weighed only 50 kilograms, with a height of 176 centimeters, although later he gained approximately 62 kilograms). He was respected by his colleagues in soccer, and was the captain of the team since 1936. In the period of 1930–1939, he played in all soccer games, with 174 consecutive matches altogether.

Albański died in Katowice.

References

See also
 History of football in Poland
 Polish soccer (football) in interwar period

1907 births
1992 deaths
Sportspeople from Lviv
Polish footballers
Poland international footballers
Footballers at the 1936 Summer Olympics
Olympic footballers of Poland
Pogoń Lwów players
Polish Austro-Hungarians
People from the Kingdom of Galicia and Lodomeria
Association football goalkeepers